Claudia Ordaz (born January 13, 1986) is an American politician. As a member of the Democratic Party, she currently serves in the Texas House of Representatives for the 79th District of El Paso’s northeast and eastside, which includes the El Paso International Airport and Fort Bliss, the country’s largest installation in the U.S. Army Forces Command (FORSCOM).

Early life, education, and career
Ordaz graduated from Montwood High School. She then went on an attended the University of Texas at El Paso, where she received a BA in Political Science in 2008. Since then she served as the El Paso council member for District 6 of the city and was Mayor pro tempore at one point. She left the city council upon her election to the state legislature. She also was a press secretary for the United States House of Representatives in the 112th United States Congress and communications director for the Texas Senate. She also attended the Lyndon B. Johnson School of Public Affairs at the University of Texas at Austin.

Claudia's former husband Vincent Perez was a El Paso County commissioner from 2012 to 2020.

Elections
Ordaz  was elected for city council of El Paso in 2014 in a special election for District 6. She kept the seat after the 2015 and 2018 general election. Claudia announced in October 2019 to run for the Texas House of Representatives District 76th seat, that was being held by Cesar Blanco at the time. Representative Blanco announced he would run for the 29th District in the Texas Senate. By announcing her run, she resigned her council seat. Claudia ran unopposed in the November 2020 election and defeated Elisa Tamayo earlier in the year in the primaries.

Political positions

Education
Ordaz is in favor of increasing funding for public schools, as well as long-term equitable funding. She believes that the state short-changed the local schools of El Paso and crippled the education system.

Health care
Ordaz supports expanding Medicaid to cover more low-income uninsured adults. She states that 1 in 3 adults in the city of El Paso are uninsured and hopes that expanding Medicaid would reduce the cost for tax payers in the long run by paying for uncompensated care.

Parental Leave
Ordaz is in favor of parents spending time at home during the first months of parenting, as well as taking care of the elderly. She passed the Parental Leave Policy for the city of El Paso, which allows employees to donate unused sick leave to parents at no cost to taxpayers. She plans to influence the position statewide.

References

External links
 Campaign website 
 State legislative page

1986 births
Living people
Hispanic and Latino American state legislators in Texas
Hispanic and Latino American women in politics
Democratic Party members of the Texas House of Representatives
Women state legislators in Texas
21st-century American politicians
21st-century American women politicians
University of Texas at El Paso alumni
People from El Paso, Texas